Finally may refer to:

Albums 
 Finally (Namie Amuro album) (2017)
 Finally (Blackstreet album) or its title song
 Finally (Sean Ensign album) or its title song "It's My Life (Finally)"
 Finally (Layzie Bone & A.K. album) (2008)
 Finally... (EP), a 1996 EP by Low
 Finally... (album), a 2002 album by One True Thing
 Finally (CeCe Peniston album) or its title song
 Finally (Velvet album) (2006)
 Finally!, a 2008 album by Iya Villania
 ...finally, a 1996 album by Too Much Joy

Songs 
 "Finally" (CeCe Peniston song) (1991)
 "Finally" (D'banj song) (2013)
 "Finally" (Fergie song) (2008)
 "Finally" (Kings of Tomorrow song) (2001)
 "Finally" (T.G. Sheppard song) (1982)
 "Finally", a song by the Frames from Burn the Maps
 "Finally", a song by Joyner Lucas from ADHD
 "Finally", a song by M.I.A. from AIM
 "Finally", a song by Yes from The Ladder
 "Finally", a 2019 single by Thabsie

Other uses 
 Finally (film), a 1991 documentary about Eric Burdon
 Finally, a keyword in exception handling syntax

See also 
 Final (disambiguation)
 Finale (disambiguation)
 Finally, Betty Carter, a 1976 album by Betty Carter
 Finally Karen, a 1997 album by Karen Clark Sheard